Milestones were a British pop rock band from Manchester, England, formed in 2014. The band consisted of vocalist Matt Clarke, guitarist and vocalist Andrew Procter, bassist Mark Threlfall, and guitarist Eden Leviston.

History
They released their debut EP, Equal Measures, independently on 6 April 2015. The band signed to Fearless Records in June 2016 and re-released their EP Equal Measures on 8 July 2016.
Frontman Matt Clarke was only 17 years old when the band signed to Fearless Records in June 2016.

On 26 January 2018, the band released the lead single, "Paranoid" from their upcoming debut album titled Red Lights. The album was released on 23 February 2018.

On 29 October 2018, Milestones announced their separation via their official Twitter page, citing pursuit of new dreams and taking a break as their reasons for the breakup. Their final farewell shows took place on 18 and 19 January 2019.

Touring
After signing to Fearless Records, Milestones toured with Hawthorne Heights, WSTR, With Confidence, Mayday Parade, Simple Plan and more.

Discography
 Equal Measures EP - Fearless Records - 8 July 2016
 Red Lights - Fearless Records - 28 February 2018

Band members
Matt Clarke - lead vocals (2014-2019)
Drew Procter  - lead guitar (2014-2019)
Mark Threlfall - bass guitar (2014-2019)
Eden Leviston - rhythm guitar (2014-2019)

References

External links
Official Website

British pop rock music groups
Musical groups from Manchester